Robert A Wolf (born Oct 6, 1961) is an American electronic musician and independent film composer from Evansville, Indiana. He has been President and CEO of Wolfymusic recording label and Wolfymusic studios. Robert's first film score in 1992 won him second place in the World fest film awards. Other awards include the Miller High Life Rock to Riches compilation record made for WYER radio in Mt. Carmel Il. two years in a row (1982)(1983) And first place in the Ambient category for August 2009 Our Stage.com song contest for his song 'No Horizon' from his 2009 'Krakatoa' album.

Robert's albums Sanctuary(1993), Paradox(1999), and Krakatoa(2009) all released on the Wolfymusic label.
Much of Robert's music from his 'Krakatoa' album has been featured on The Weather Channel's Local on the 8's segment.

Robert works extensively with director James Arnett and A.I.A. Motion Picture company in Tucson Arizona.
Robert has written and recorded the music score for several of James Arnett's films such as The Tell Tale Heart(1992), Mary Shelley's The Last Man(2008), and Blocked(2011). Robert's work can also be heard in the film Dead on Site(2008), Overcoming Lives Trauma(2011),and Love a La Carte(2012).

Discography
 Sanctuary 1993
 Paradox 1999
 Krakatoa 2009
 Pangea 2015

Film Scores
 The Tell Tale Heart 1992
 Just Another Box 2006
 Mary Shelley's The Last Man 2008
 Dead on Site 2008
 Blocked 2011
 Overcoming Life's Trauma 2011
 Love a La Carte 2012
 Aliens from Uranus 2012
 The Z 2015

References
 A.I.A. Productions
 Robert A. Wolf Internet Movie Data Base
 Evansville Courier Press (art beat)
 Evansville Courier Press CD review
 MTV Artists
 Krakatoa CD review by Matthew Forss
 YouTube film score sample reeel
 Press release for the film 'Blocked' going to Cannes film market April 30, 2011
 Press release for The Weather Channel music July 3, 2009
 Press release for Overcoming Life's Trauma Nov. 28, 2011
 Wiki Local on the 8's music
 The Weather Channel on Last FM
 Youtube Krakatoa promo
 Post production The Last Man A.I.A. Productions

American electronic musicians
Living people
1961 births